Propioniferax innocua is a Gram-positive, non-spore-forming and non-motile bacterium from the genus Propioniferax which has been isolated from human skin.

References 

Propionibacteriales
Bacteria described in 1992
Monotypic bacteria genera